Liparis latifolia is a species of orchid native to Hainan, Thailand, Indonesia, Malaysia, the Philippines and New Guinea.

References 

latifolia
Flora of Hainan
Orchids of Thailand
Orchids of Indonesia
Orchids of Malaysia
Orchids of the Philippines
Orchids of New Guinea
Plants described in 1830